This is a list of singles that reached number one on the Swiss Hitparade from 1968 through 1979.

Number-one singles

See also
1968 in music
1969 in music
1970s in music

References

Switzerland
Switzerland
Number-one hits
1968-1979